Anita Błochowiak  (born 7 November 1973) is a Polish political figure who has been serving in the country's national parliament, the Sejm, since 2001.

A native of the town of Pabianice, the seat of Pabianice County, within the metropolitan area of Łódź, the nation's third-largest city, Anita Błochowiak was elected, on 23 September 2001, as a member of the Democratic Left Alliance, to represent Sieradz district 11 in the Sejm.  She was re-elected from the same district on 25 September 2005, receiving 3451 votes, and again retained her seat two years later, in the 21 October 2007 Polish parliamentary election.

See also
Members of Polish Sejm 2001-2005
List of Sejm members (2005–2007)

External links
Anita Błochowiak's political website (includes photographs)
Anita Błochowiak at the Sejm website (includes official photograph, personal interests, voting record and transcripts of speeches)

1973 births
Living people
People from Pabianice
Democratic Left Alliance politicians
Members of the Polish Sejm 2005–2007
Members of the Polish Sejm 2001–2005
Members of the Polish Sejm 2007–2011
Women members of the Sejm of the Republic of Poland
21st-century Polish women politicians